About a Burning Fire is the fourth album by post-hardcore band Blindside. It was released on February 24, 2004 through Elektra and 3 Points Records. The album is notable for featuring The Smashing Pumpkins' Billy Corgan on the track "Hooray, It's L.A."

"All of Us" became the album's lead single. Its music video features a young man chasing after a woman through a dead, leafless forest. In his desperation, the man's arms begin to stretch out to her in a feat similar to Mr. Fantastic's. The video aired considerably on Fuse TV.

Track listing
"Eye of the Storm" – 4:02
"Follow You Down" – 3:01
"All of Us" – 3:31
"Shekina" – 4:46
"Hooray, It's L.A." – 3:17 (Featuring Billy Corgan of The Smashing Pumpkins)
"Swallow" – 2:25
"Die Buying" – 3:18
"Across Waters Again" – 4:13
"After You're Gone" – 2:57
"Where the Sun Never Dies" – 4:18
"Roads" – 4:14
"About a Burning Fire" – 4:36

B-Sides: "I Know Why You Dress in Black" – 2:29

Band 
Marcus Dahlström – drummer
Simon Grenehed – guitarist, vocalist
Christian Lindskog – vocalist
Tomas Näslund – bassist, pianist, vocalist

Credits 
All songs written by Blindside
Published by Walking Home Music (ASCAP)
Produced by Howard Benson
Mixed by Chris Lord-Alge
Recorded by Mike Plotnikoff
Additional engineering by Eric Miller
Digital editing: Paul DeCarli, Mike Plotnikoff and Eric Miller
Additional recording by Lasse Marten at Decibel Stockholm Studios
Pre-production at Valley Center Studios
Mastered by Tom Maker at Precision Mastering (Hollywood, CA)
Drum tech: John Nicholson at Drum Fetish
Billy Corgan: guitar on "Hooray, It's L.A."
Emma Härdelin: vocals on "Shekina"
Jon Rekdal: trumpet solo on "Roads"
Jen Kuhn: cello on "Shekina" and "Roads"
Neel Hammond: violin on "Shekina" and "Roads"
Petter Winnberg: double bass on "Shekina"
Howard Benson: vox continental organ on "Swallow"
Billy Corgan appears courtesy of Reprise Records
Management: Tim M. Cook, Tim Ottley and Rachel Koeneke for Cook Management, LLC.
A&R: Howard Benson
Production coordinator: Dana Childs
Business management: Mark Kaplan for Kaplan Corp.
Legal: Doug Mark, Esquire for Barnes, Morris, Klein, Mark and Yorn
Booking: Michael Arlin at Artist Group International
International booking: Emma Banks at Helter Skelter
Tour management and live sound by Danny Hill
Art direction: Asterik Studio and blindside with Lili Picou
Design: Asterik Studio, Seattle
Photography: Kris McCaddon
Band photography: Daniel Mansson
Album coordinator: Danielle Bond

References

2004 albums
Blindside (band) albums
Albums produced by Howard Benson